Carex capitellata is a tussock-forming species of perennial sedge in the family Cyperaceae. It is native to parts of Turkey and the Caucasus.

See also
List of Carex species

References

capitellata
Taxa named by Pierre Edmond Boissier
Plants described in 1882
Flora of Turkey
Taxa named by Benjamin Balansa